"Alkalispirillum" is a moderately halophilic and alkaliphilic genus of bacteria from the family of Ectothiorhodospiraceae with one known species (Alkalispirillum mobile).

References

Chromatiales
Bacteria genera
Monotypic bacteria genera
Taxa described in 2002